41 Potencjometrów Pana Jana ("41 Mr. Jan's Potentiometers") is a posthumously released live album by Czesław Niemen. It contains recordings from an improvised concert, performed at the Riviera club, Warsaw, on 9 May 1974 by his "Aerolit" project. The tape, "cut and mixed" by scissors and scotch tape  by Niemen himself and Janusz Kosiński, was stored in the archives of Polish Radio.

The full concert was 82 minutes long, but the recording was shortened by Niemen and added to the archives in the late 1970s.  The title "41 Potencjometrów Pana Jana" came from the name of Janusz Kosiński (who Niemen referred to as "Jan") who helped edit Niemens material, and the number of minutes of material that they kept from the original concert. (In fact, they had only eight potentiometers).

Track listing 
 "41 Potencjometrów Pana Jana" - 41:57

Personnel 
 Czesław Niemen - Mini Moog, Mellotron, vocal
 Jan Błędowski - electric violin
 Piotr Dziemski - drums
 Jacek Gazda - bass
 Sławomir Piwowar - guitar

References

Czesław Niemen albums
2007 live albums